De Beghinselen der Weeghconst ( "The Principles of the Art of Weighing") is a book about statics written by Flemish physicist Simon Stevin in Dutch. It was published in 1586, in a single volume, with De Weeghdaet ( "The Act of Weighing"), De Beghinselen des Waterwichts ("The Principles of Hydrostatics"), and an Anhang (an appendix). In 1605 there was another edition.

Importance

The importance of the book was summarized by the Encyclopædia Britannica:

Contents
The first part consists of two books, together account for 95 pages, here divided into 10 pieces.

Book I 
Start: panegyrics, Mission to Rudolf II, Uytspraeck Vande Weerdicheyt of Duytsche Tael, Cortbegryp
Bepalinghen and Begheerten (definitions and assumptions)
 Proposal 1 t / m 4: hefboomwet
 Proposal 5 t / m 12: a balance with weights pilaer
 Proposition 13 t / m 18: follow-up, with hefwicht, two supports
 Proposition 19: balance on an inclined plane, with cloot Crans
 Proposal 20 t / m 28: pilaer with scheefwichten, hanging, body

Book II 
 Proposal 1 t / m 6: center of gravity boards – triangle, rectilinear flat
 Proposal 7 t / m 13: trapezium, divide, cut fire
 Proposition 14 t / m 24: center of gravity of bodies – pillar, pyramid, burner
 The Weeghdaet
 The Beghinselen des Waterwichts
 Anhang
 Byvough

See also
 Simon Stevin

References

Further reading
 

1586 books
Mathematics books
Physics books
Statics